Participation TV (viewer participation) is a broad term referring to television programming which relies on audience participation as a key form of the program or revenues.

History

Genres
 Reality TV - Big Brother was the pioneer
 Talent shows - viewers vote for bands/artists/performs to stay on the show
 Quiz TV - viewers answer questions via premium rate phone numbers or send premium rate texts to win prizes
 Babe Channels - viewers interact with girls on screen by phoning a premium rate number or sending premium rate texts
 Competitions - simple competitions that are not core to a show but provide additional revenues (e.g. GMTV)

Regulations governing participation TV vary throughout the world - but the format is gaining popularity as traditional TV advertising revenues decline. There have been many scandals surrounding consumer deception and improper conduct relating to the running of competitions - particularly in the UK (a leading territory for participation TV).

Typically a TV production company will come up with the concept and produce a show, licensing it to a broadcaster and partnering with telecoms companies for the platforms required to drive the revenues.

Participation TV 2.0 

The phrase ‘Participation TV’ was first used on reality television shows back in 2002, where the viewers could ‘Participate’ with the TV show by paying to send a text or call a number to register their vote. This was in the days before Smartphones and the Cloud enabled up to 80% of TV viewers to use their Second Screens while watching the TV.

Viewers no longer have to send Texts or Tweets that are added up by the TV Producers and then revealed at the end of the TV show. In ‘Participation TV 2.0’ the viewers are deeply engaged through their web devices, playing along with the Broadcast or TV show in real-time and affecting the show content in the moment.

References

External links
 Orca Digital's Participation TV platform
 Ofcom's regulation of UK Participation TV
 Mobile Marketing Magazine's explanation of Participation TV

Television genres